Adama Koné Clofie (born 3 November 1967) is an Ivorian footballer. He played in 13 matches for the Ivory Coast national football team from 1993 to 2000. He was also named in Ivory Coast's squad for the 1994 African Cup of Nations tournament.

References

1967 births
Living people
Ivorian footballers
Ivory Coast international footballers
1994 African Cup of Nations players
Place of birth missing (living people)
Association football midfielders
ASEC Mimosas players
Africa Sports d'Abidjan players